Late Night Tales: David Shrigley (a.k.a. Shrigley Forced to Speak with Others) is a special edition spoken word album recorded by David Shrigley, released as part of the Late Night Tales / Another Late Night series.

Track listing

References

Shrigley, David
2006 compilation albums